Tithraustes snyderi is a moth of the family Notodontidae. It is found in cloud-forest habitats within La Amistad, an international park extending from south-central Costa Rica into the Chiriqui Province of Panama.

The length of the forewings is 12.5–13 mm for males and 15 mm for females. The ground color of the forewings is chocolate brown to dark brown. The basal third is semihyaline with dark brown veins as they pass through. The hindwings have an oblique white central area. The outer margin has a dark, charcoal-gray band. The anal margin is covered with a mixture of light gray and dark charcoal-gray scales.

The larvae feed on Chamaedorea costaricana, Chamaedorea crucensis and Geonoma edulis.

Etymology
The species is named in honor of Cal Snyder.

References

Moths described in 2008
Notodontidae